The Album is the debut album by the group Mantronix.

Reception

From contemporary reviews, J. D. Considine gave the album a three star rating, noting its sound was "pretty run-of-the mill for hip-hop" with its "vintage electronic percussion" and M.C. Tee's "standard-issue raps." Considine specifically noted that Mantronix "definitely has a way with the music. They assemble their jams with funky finesse, revving up the marhciner behind "Bassline" until the rap evaporates into pure rhythm" and that "Mega-Mix" was "about as CONCRETE as this music gets." "The Album"'s track "Bassline" was praised by Ken Tucker who called it the most well-known cut as "a slinky dance-music composition that employs rap-music cadences to achieve a choppy frenetic effect" while stating the rest of the album "Isn't as innovative" with the exception of "Mega-Mix" which was "almost abstract collage of sound effects, comes close." Paul Mathur of Melody Maker proclaimed the album went "for the paint stripper approach, burning away electro's lesser indulgences and leaving hard core hip hop of the highest order."

The NME placed the album at number 10 on its year-end list of best albums of 1986.

Track listing
 "Bassline" (Kurtis Mantronik, MC Tee) – 5:26
 "Needle to the Groove" (Mantronik, MC Tee) – 3:41
 "Mega-Mix" (Mantronik, MC Tee) – 5:35
 "Hardcore Hip-Hop" (Mantronik, MC Tee) – 6:18
 "Ladies" (Mantronik, MC Tee) – 6:55
 "Get Stupid "Fresh" Part I" (Mantronik, MC Tee) – 3:52
 "Fresh Is the Word" (Mantronik, MC Tee) – 5:31

Bonus tracks
In February 2006, Virgin/EMI re-released the album in the UK with five bonus tracks and new cover art.
 "Ladies (Revived)"
 "Bassline (Stretched)"
 "Hardcore Hip Hop (NME Mix)"
 "Ladies (Dub)"
 "Ladies (Instrumental)"

Double-CD deluxe edition bonus tracks
On February 12, 2008, Traffic Entertainment Group released a double-CD edition of the album, titled simply Mantronix, with an extra disc and new cover art. The extra tracks are as follows:
Bassline (Club Version)
Needle to the Groove (12" Version)
Fresh is the Word (12" Version)
Ladies (UK Remix)
Bassline (Radio Version)
Bassline (12" Version)
Needle to the Groove (Alternate Version)
Jamming on the Groove
Needle to the Groove (Live)
Ladies (Live)
Ladies (A Capella)
Get Stupid "Fresh" Part 1 (A Capella)
Fresh is the Word (Radio Version)
Fresh is the Beat	
Fresh is the Word (A Capella)

Chart positions
Album

Singles

References

Sources

External links
 [ Mantronix: The Album] at allmusic

1985 debut albums
Mantronix albums
Sleeping Bag Records albums
Virgin Records albums
Albums produced by Kurtis Mantronik